Irwin Racing has been the sponsored identity of a number of Australian Supercars Championship teams.